Sarah Hörst (born April 26, 1982) is an associate professor of planetary sciences at Johns Hopkins University, who focuses on understanding planetary atmospheric hazes, in particular the atmosphere of Saturn's moon Titan.

Education 
Hörst attended high school at Oak Hall School in Gainesville, Florida. Her mother is a neuroscientist and her father was a medical doctor. She received a Bachelors in Planetary Science and Literature from the California Institute of Technology. At Caltech she worked with Michael Brown studying Europa and Titan using the Celestron telescope. Whilst the telescope has been described as "amateur", Hörst managed to image Titan to calculate a light curve and look for clouds. She was on the Caltech track team. After graduating in 2004, Hörst joined the Jet Propulsion Laboratory and worked on the image analysis for the Imaging Science Subsystem of the Cassini–Huygens spacecraft. She also worked at Institut de Planétologie et d'Astrophysique de Grenoble (IPAG). She earned her PhD, Post-Cassini Investigations of Titan Atmospheric Chemistry, in 2011 from the University of Arizona. Here she worked in the Lunar and Planetary Laboratory studying the chemistry of Titan's atmosphere. Her team was the first to show that amino acids and nucleotide bases may be present in Titan's atmosphere. She was awarded the Peter B. Wagner Memorial Award for Women in Atmospheric Sciences.

Research 
Hörst moved to the University of Colorado Boulder as a National Science Foundation Astronomy and Astrophysics Postdoctoral Fellow in 2011. In 2014, Hörst joined Johns Hopkins University as an Assistant Professor where she specializes in the atmospheric chemistry of planets and their moons.

In March 2018 Hörst's group demonstrated that they could simulate the atmosphere of alien worlds inside the laboratory, allowing them to analyse the composition of their haze. The study will aid in the analysis of data collected by the James Webb Space Telescope, which NASA expect to launch in 2021.

She is part of the Science & Engineering team for the Dragonfly mission to Titan.

Awards and honors 
Hörst won the American Astronomical Society (AAS), Laboratory Astrophysics Division (LAD) Early Career Award for 2020. In 2020, she was awarded the James B. Macelwane Medal of the American Geophysical Union.

Writing and science outreach 
Hörst's work has appeared in Smithsonian, as well as on SciShow and the BBC News. She works with primary and secondary school teachers to enable them to use planetary science in their classroom.

She has appeared on The Planetary Society's show Planetary Radio.

References

External links 
 
 Sarah Hörst's writing for The Planetary Society

Planetary scientists
University of Arizona alumni
American astrophysicists
California Institute of Technology alumni
Women planetary scientists
Johns Hopkins University faculty
Johns Hopkins University people
21st-century American astronomers
21st-century American physicists
21st-century American women scientists
University of Colorado fellows
Women astrophysicists